Dolly Domingos Menga (born 2 May 1993) is a Belgian-Angolan professional footballer, who plays as a forward for MCS Liège. He has played at international level for the Angola national team.

Club career

Benfica
On 30 August 2014, Menga signed for Portuguese champions Benfica until 2017. On 20 September, he made his debut for Benfica B, where he played 12 matches in Segunda Liga.

Braga and loans
On 2 February 2015, Menga signed for Braga in Portugal until 2018, for an undisclosed transfer fee. He made his debut for the first team in a 4–1 away defeat against Sporting CP. On 7 July 2015, Menga agreed to a one-year loan at recently promoted Tondela. In September 2016 he was loaned to Hapoel Tel Aviv, then he was loaned to F.C Ashdod FC. On 1 July 2017, Menga parted ways with Braga, as his contract ran out.

Blackpool
On 10 November 2017, Menga was picked up on a free transfer by EFL League One side Blackpool.

Livingston
Menga signed a two-year contract with Scottish Premiership club Livingston in August 2018. On 30 September 2018, he scored his first goal for Livingston in a 1–0 home win over Rangers. He was released by Livingston on 21 August 2020.

Loan to Petro de Luanda
On 18 July 2019, he was loaned to Angolan club, Petro de Luanda, for the 2019–20 season.

MCS Liège
Menga signed for MCS Liège in 2021.

International career
In July 2014, Menga was asked to switch his international allegiance to Angola. On 15 November 2014, he debuted for the national team against Gabon in CAN 2015.

International goals
Scores and results list Angola's goal tally first.

Career statistics

References

External links
 
 
 
 
 
 

1993 births
Living people
Footballers from Liège
Association football forwards
Angolan footballers
Angola international footballers
Belgian footballers
Belgium youth international footballers
Belgian people of Angolan descent
Belgian Pro League players
English Football League players
Israeli Premier League players
Girabola players
Liga Portugal 2 players
Primeira Liga players
Scottish Professional Football League players
Serie A players
Atlético Petróleos de Luanda players
Blackpool F.C. players
C.D. Tondela players
F.C. Ashdod players
Hapoel Tel Aviv F.C. players
Lierse S.K. players
Livingston F.C. players
S.C. Braga players
S.C. Braga B players
S.L. Benfica B players
Sint-Truidense V.V. players
Standard Liège players
Torino F.C. players
Belgian expatriate footballers
Angolan expatriate footballers
Expatriate footballers in Italy
Expatriate footballers in Portugal
Expatriate footballers in Israel
Expatriate footballers in England
Expatriate footballers in Scotland